Çubukçu is a Turkish surname. Notable people with the surname include:

 Bilal Çubukçu (born 1987), Turkish footballer
Bayhan Çubukçu (1934-2021), Turkish academician
 Ege Çubukçu
 Nimet Çubukçu (born 1965), Turkish politician and lawyer
 Ömer Çubukçu

Turkish-language surnames